Jake Armerding is an American folk musician and multi-instrumentalist from Boston, Massachusetts. He plays mostly acoustic string instruments like the mandolin, acoustic guitar, and fiddle. In 1990, Jake began playing with Northern Lights occasionally. He joined the band full-time in 1992 and was a member until 1999 when he left the band to pursue a solo career. Jake attended Wheaton College where he received a degree in English literature. In 2001, Armerding won the Best New Artist Award from Boston's folk-radio station, WUMB.

In addition to his solo efforts, Jake makes up half of a duo, The Fretful Porcupine, along with saxophonist Kevin Gosa.  Armerding is also a member of Barnstar!, a "bluegrass [band] for people who hate bluegrass." He is on the faculty of the Traditional Music Project housed at the Real School of Music in Burlington, Massachusetts.

Jake recently played violin and mandolin as part of an ensemble recording music for the audiobook version of Josh Ritter's first novel, Bright's Passage.

Notable Performances 
Jake has made multiple appearances at The Kennedy Center in Washington, D.C.

Discography 

Northern Lights
1994 - Wrong Highway Blues
1996 - Living in the City

Solo
1999 - Caged Bird
2003 - Jake Armerding (released by Compass Records)
2007 - Walking on the World
2009 - Songs in Stained Glass
2009 - Her
2013 - Cosmos in the Chaos
2015 - Your Voice Like Brake Lights: A Collection

The Fretful Porcupine
2010 - Cellar Sessions EP

Barnstar!
2011 - C'mon!
2015 - Sit Down! Get Up! Get Out!

Rosin
2017 - Rosin

Contributions
2005 - Mark Stepakoff - There Goes the Neighborhood (fiddle)
2006 - Scott Alarik - All That Is True: Folk Songs Old and New
2009 - Taylor Armerding - Head That Way (fiddle and voice)

References

External links 
 Official Site
 The Fretful Porcupine

Year of birth missing (living people)
Living people
Folk musicians from Massachusetts
American folk singers
American male singer-songwriters
Musicians from Boston
Wheaton College (Illinois) alumni
Singer-songwriters from Massachusetts